The 1982 British Grand Prix (formally the XXXV Marlboro British Grand Prix) was a Formula One motor race held at Brands Hatch on 18 July 1982. It was the tenth race of the 1982 Formula One World Championship.

The 76-lap race was won by Niki Lauda, driving a McLaren-Ford, after he started from fifth position. Didier Pironi finished second in a Ferrari, while teammate Patrick Tambay achieved his first podium finish by coming third. Derek Warwick stunned and delighted the British fans by taking his Toleman, a team who frequently failed to qualify for Grand Prix races during 1981 and 1982, through the field into second place before being forced to retire. Pironi took over the lead of the Drivers' Championship from Lauda's teammate, John Watson, who spun off on the third lap.

Classification

Qualifying

Race

Championship standings after the race

Drivers' Championship standings

Constructors' Championship standings

Note: Only the top five positions are included for both sets of standings.

References

British Grand Prix
British Grand Prix
Grand Prix
British Grand Prix